B. Subhashan Reddy (2 March 1943 — 1 May 2019) was an Indian Judge who served as Chief Justice of High Courts of India and Chairperson of the first Human Rights Commission of Andhra Pradesh.

Career
Reddy was born at Bagh Amberpet in Hyderabad in 1943. He studied at Sultan Bazar and Chadarghat High Schools in Hyderabad, New Science College and passed law from Osmania University. Since 1966, he started practice in the Andhra Pradesh High Court on Constitutional, Civil, Criminal, Revenue and Taxation matters. Reddy practiced in the Supreme Court of India also. On 25 November 1991 he was appointed Judge of the Andhra Pradesh High Court. He was elevated as Chief Justice of Madras High Court on 12 September 2001 thereafter transferred to Kerala High Court on 21 November 2004. Justice Reddy retired from the post on 2 March 2005. He also served as the first Chairman of Andhra Pradesh State Human Rights Commission and in October 2012, Reddy took charge in the post of Lokayukta of Andhra Pradesh. He died on 1 May 2019 at AIG Hospital in Gachibowli, Hyderabad.

References

1943 births
2019 deaths
Ombudsmen in India
Indian judges
Judges of the Andhra Pradesh High Court
Chief Justices of the Madras High Court
Chief Justices of the Kerala High Court
Osmania University alumni
People from Hyderabad, India
20th-century Indian judges
21st-century Indian judges